Louis Benjamin Francisco (born October 23, 1981), is an American former professional baseball outfielder, who is currently a major league scout for the Los Angeles Angels. He played in Major League Baseball (MLB) for the Cleveland Indians, Philadelphia Phillies, Toronto Blue Jays, Houston Astros, Tampa Bay Rays, and New York Yankees.

Early life
He is a 1999 graduate of Servite High School, a Roman Catholic high school for boys, in Anaheim, California where he played on the same baseball team as former Indians teammate Ryan Garko. He later attended and played baseball at Cypress Junior College in 2000 and went on to play at the University of California, Los Angeles in 2001 through 2003.

Professional career

Cleveland Indians

He was selected by the Cleveland Indians in the fifth round (154th overall) of the 2002 Major League Baseball Draft.
He was called up from the Triple-A Buffalo Bisons on May 1,
and made his major league debut that night as a late-game defensive replacement. On June 29, 2007, Francisco got his first hit and his first home run in his first major league start. His home run came leading off the bottom of the ninth inning, giving the Indians a 2–1, walk-off win over the Tampa Bay Devil Rays.

Philadelphia Phillies
On July 29, 2009, Francisco was traded to the Philadelphia Phillies along with reigning Cy Young Award winner Cliff Lee, for a selection of top minor league prospects including Carlos Carrasco, Jason Donald, Lou Marson, and Jason Knapp.

He spent the remainder of 2009 and the entire 2010 season as a reserve outfielder and pinch hitter with the Phillies.  Following the departure of starting right fielder Jayson Werth, Francisco earned a regular spot in the Phillies' starting lineup at the onset of the 2011 season. By mid season, however, Francisco returned to his reserve role.

Though limited in play during the second half of the year, this year Francisco will most notably be remembered for his clutch performance in Game 3 of the 2011 NLDS against the St. Louis Cardinals. In a scoreless game, with Shane Victorino on second, the Cardinals elected to intentionally walk Carlos Ruiz in order to face Francisco.  After nearly hitting a home run against Jaime Garcia a few weeks earlier, Francisco blasted a 405-foot home run into the Phillies' bullpen. Francisco ended up being the winning run in a game where the Philadelphia Phillies defeated the Cardinals 3–2.

Toronto Blue Jays
On December 12, 2011, he was traded to the Toronto Blue Jays in exchange for minor leaguer Frank Gailey.

Houston Astros
On July 20, 2012, the Blue Jays traded Francisco, Francisco Cordero, Asher Wojciechowski, David Rollins, Joe Musgrove, Carlos Pérez, and a player to be named later (Kevin Comer) to the Houston Astros for J. A. Happ, Brandon Lyon, and David Carpenter.

Tampa Bay Rays
On August 31, 2012, the Tampa Bay Rays acquired Francisco for a player to be named later.

Return to Indians
On January 21, 2013, Francisco signed a minor-league deal with the Cleveland Indians. The Indians released him on March 11, 2013.

New York Yankees
On March 11, 2013, Francisco signed a minor-league deal with the New York Yankees. He was added to the Yankees' Opening Day roster. He was used as the designated hitter against left-handed pitchers but struggled drastically batting .103 in the month of April. Francisco was designated for assignment on May 26, and was released from the team on June 3, 2013.

Lancaster Barnstormers
On June 8, 2014, Francisco signed with the Lancaster Barnstormers of the Atlantic League. He was active for the Barnstormers next game the following day against the Camden Riversharks.

Arizona Diamondbacks
On December 15, 2014, Francisco signed a minor league contract with the Arizona Diamondbacks. On March 15, 2015, he was released by the Diamondbacks.

Rieleros de Aguascalientes
On May 8, 2015, Francisco signed with the Rieleros de Aguascalientes of the Mexican Baseball League. He was released on May 24, 2015.

Post-playing career
In 2016, he was hired by the Los Angeles Angels as a scout. In 2022, Francisco was inducted into the Buffalo Baseball Hall of Fame, in recognition of his three seasons with the Buffalo Bisons.

References

External links

Ben Francisco at Astros Daily

1981 births
Living people
African-American baseball players
Akron Aeros players
American expatriate baseball players in Canada
American expatriate baseball players in Mexico
Buffalo Bisons (minor league) players
Baseball players from California
Cleveland Indians players
Cypress Chargers baseball players
Dunedin Blue Jays players
Houston Astros players
Lake County Captains players
Lancaster Barnstormers players
Los Angeles Angels scouts
Mahoning Valley Scrappers players
Major League Baseball outfielders
Mexican League baseball right fielders
New Hampshire Fisher Cats players
New York Yankees players
Philadelphia Phillies players
Rieleros de Aguascalientes players
Servite High School alumni
Sportspeople from Santa Ana, California
Tampa Bay Rays players
Toronto Blue Jays players
Tucson Padres players
UCLA Bruins baseball players
21st-century African-American sportspeople
20th-century African-American people
Anchorage Glacier Pilots players